The climate of the Alps is the climate, or average weather conditions over a long period of time, of the exact middle Alpine region of Europe. As air rises from sea level to the upper regions of the atmosphere the temperature decreases. The effect of mountain topography on prevailing winds is to force warm air from the lower region into an upper zone where it expands in volume at the cost of a proportionate loss of heat, often accompanied by the precipitation of moisture in the form of snow, rain or hail.

Climate as a function of elevation

Because air cools as it rises, the climate of the Alps is strongly dependent on the elevation. The Alps contain a number of different kinds of climate zones, by elevation. These zones can be described by the Köppen climate classification, and also correspond to the biotic zones of the Alps.

Like much of lowland northern Europe, the summers are mild and the winters are cool, but not cold. The climate is moderated by proximity to the Atlantic Ocean. The climate creates the colline biotic zone in the lowlands, which is characterized by the deciduous forest of the Western European broadleaf forests ecoregion.

As elevation increases, the winters become colder and the summers become shorter. A mixture of conifer and deciduous trees occupy this montane zone, leading to a change in ecoregion to Alps conifer and mixed forests.

The shorter growing season shifts the forest to be purely coniferous.

The summers become cool and only grasses and low plants are adapted to grow.

At these altitudes, no plants can grow and the ground is either rock or ice.

References

 
Alps
Alps
Ecology of the Alps